Huntington Hotel may refer to:
 Huntington Hotel (San Francisco)
 Huntington Hotel (Pasadena), founded by Henry E. Huntington